Parthasarathy is one of the titles and names of Krishna.

Parthasarathy may also refer to:

People

First name
Parthasarathy Iyengar (1903–1983), Tamil lawyer and police commissioner
Parthasarathy (Parthu), Telugu playback singer known as Parthu
Parthasarathy Ranganathan, American engineer
Parthasarathy Reddy, Telugu politician
Parthasarathy Sharma (1948–2010), Indian cricketer

Surname
Aarthi Parthasarathy, Indian filmmaker and webcomic artist
Aralumallige Parthasarathy (born 1948), Indian historian
B. Parthasarathy, Tamil politician
Gopalaswami Parthasarathy (born 1940), Indian diplomat
Gopalaswami Parthasarathy (diplomat) (1912–1995), Indian diplomat and journalist
Indira Parthasarathy, Tamil writer and playwright
K. Parthasarathy (born 1943), Indian cricket umpire
K. R. Parthasarathy (graph theorist), Indian graph theorist
K. R. Parthasarathy (probabilist) (born 1936), Indian probabilist
Malini Parthasarathy, Indian journalist
M. D. Parthasarathy (1910–1963), Indian actor and director
Na. Parthasarathy (1932–1987), Tamil novelist
R. Parthasarathy (born 1934), Indian poet
Rajagopalan Parthasarathy, Indian mathematician
Rajalakshmi Parthasarathy (born 1925), Indian journalist
S. Parthasarathy (died 1965), Indian journalist
Sampath Parthasarathy, American food scientist
Sanjay Parthasarathy, Indian technology executive
Srilekha Parthasarathy, Tamil singer
Sriram Parthasarathy, Tamil playback singer
Thiruvenkatachari Parthasarathy, Indian game theorist
Swami Parthasarathy (born 1927), Indian philosopher
Vibha Parthasarathy (born 1940), Indian educational theorist
Y. G. Parthasarathy (1917–1990), Tamil playwright

Places
Aranmula Parthasarathy Temple, a temple in Pathanamthitta District, Kerala, India
Parthasarathy Temple, Mundakkayam, a temple in Kottayam District, Kerala, India
Parthasarathy Temple, Triplicane, a temple in Chennai, India
27244 Parthasarathy, a minor planet

Others
Parthasarathy's theorem